Rini Raj (born November 1999) is an Indian film and television actress who predominantly works in the Malayalam industry. She is well known for her role as Balachandrika in the Malayalam soap opera, Karuthamuthu.

Career
Rini started her acting career at the age of 12. She starred in a music video, Orma when she was a grade 7 student. She played the second female lead in the 2014 Malayalam film Maramkothi. She played the protagonist, Myna in the soap opera Mangalyapattu aired in Mazhavil Manorama. She played one of the three female leads in 2017 film Smart Boys. She rose into fame playing Balachandrika in Karuthamuthu. She played a supporting role in Kasthooriman. She then played the female lead Abhirami in Thamarathumbi. She is currently part of celebrity game show Star Magic.

Filmography

Films

Television

Special appearances

References

External links
 

Living people
Malayali people
Actresses from Kerala
Indian soap opera actresses
21st-century Indian actresses
Actresses in Malayalam television
Actresses in Malayalam cinema
1999 births